KFYO (790 kHz) is a Lubbock, Texas, based news/talk radio station, owned by Townsquare Media. Its studios and transmitters are located in southwest Lubbock.

History

Before Lubbock

In 1927, T. E. Kirksey, under the Kirksey Bros. Battery and Electric Company, established a radio station at Breckenridge, which operated with 15 watts on 1420 kHz. In early 1928, it was allowed to increase power to 100 watts.

On September 22, 1928, KFYO moved to Abilene, where it remained on 1420 and upgraded to 250 watts day and 100 watts night. The station maintained studios in the Grace Hotel. 16-year-old Grant Turner, later an announcer for the Grand Ole Opry in Nashville, joined the station when it moved to Abilene.

At times, KFYO has claimed a longer history, stretching back to an experimental station allegedly started by Kirksey in 1923, in Bentonville, Arkansas. However, no station was licensed to Kirksey there. Bentonville's first radio station was KFVX, run by Ralph H. Porter in 1925 but closed the same year. There was an earlier and unrelated KFYO, which operated at Texarkana, Texas. KFYO Texarkana shut down in February 1927, and KFYO Breckenridge received a construction permit six months later.

Moving to Lubbock
In February 1932, Kirksey filed and was approved to move KFYO to Lubbock on 1310 kHz, utilizing a site at 2312 5th Street, three blocks east of Texas Tech University. The station began broadcasting from Lubbock on April 23. Two years later, the station moved to new downtown studios and offices located at 914 Avenue J. Also in 1934, KFYO aired the first-ever radio broadcast of a Texas Tech football game; it then began broadcasting games regularly in 1935, holding the rights continuously through the 1993 season.

Several other cornerstones of KFYO programming and Lubbock history passed through KFYO at this time.  In 1935, the station began airing the Sunday morning services of the Downtown (Lubbock) Bible Class Sunday morning services; the weekly service aired on KFYO until 1946 and returned to KFYO from KSEL in December 1987. The precursor of the Chuck Wagon Gang—then known as the Carter Quartet—made its radio debut that same year over KFYO, performing weekly and earning the group $15 a week. The group included David Parker Carter 'Dad', son Jim (born Ernest) and daughters Rose and Effie. In 1936, the Carters changed their group name to the Chuck Wagon Gang, moved to the Dallas-Fort Worth area, and joined radio station WBAP.

Plains Radio ownership
Kirksey sold the station he had built—and moved twice—to the Plains Radio Broadcasting Company, owned by the Lubbock Avalanche-Journal and Amarillo Globe-News newspapers. DeWitt "Judge" Landis became the general manager, and KFYO affiliated with NBC. The new owners also rebuilt the transmission facility, which was still using the original transmitter put into service at Breckenridge ten years prior. The station would change affiliations several more times, to the Mutual Broadcasting System in 1937 and again to the Blue Network, later ABC, in 1944. KFYO moved to 1340 kHz in NARBA reallocation on March 29, 1941; the year before, it increased its power to 250 watts.

On July 1, 1945, KFYO broadcast live from Lubbock's airfield, when the first commercial airline flight made its way to Lubbock. The flight was a Braniff Airways flight from Dallas, that continued to Albuquerque. The station also operated an FM simulcast—KFYO-FM 99.5, the first FM station on the South Plains—from April 18, 1948, to 1950.

KFYO would engage in a seven-year fight to improve its facilities in the late 1940s and early 1950s. In 1945, KFYO filed to move to 790 kHz and increase its power to 5,000 watts. The Federal Communications Commission initially denied the bid in favor of a competing application from Lubbock County Broadcasting Company, which owned KBWD in Brownwood, but KFYO appealed and was successful in having the case remanded for new hearings in 1949. Despite a hearing examiner finding in favor of Lubbock County in 1950, the FCC awarded the frequency to KFYO in October 1951. The frequency change took place on January 19, 1953, at which time the station activated its three-tower array near 82nd and Quaker streets. The new facility allowed KFYO to be heard in Amarillo, Abilene, Midland, Odessa, San Angelo, Ozona and eastern New Mexico. 1340 was awarded to a new station, KDUB.

On June 1, 1954, KFYO switched affiliations from ABC to CBS Radio, giving the network its first outlet in Lubbock and first reliable reception in much of the South Plains.

KFYO was the only station to broadcast continuously before, during, and after the Lubbock tornado that struck the downtown area on May 11, 1970. KFYO also provided Lubbock's only link to the outside world during the tornado by broadcasting over phone to 1080 KRLD in Dallas. Because KFYO was the assigned civil defense radio station in Lubbock, the station was equipped with two diesel backup generators, which provided power for KFYO's studios and transmitter site at 82nd & Quaker. With much of the city damaged and without power for days—and with two radio stations having lost their towers in the storm—KFYO became the vital link for Lubbock and the region in the hours and days after the tornado, broadcasting multiple 24-hour commercial-free days and receiving local, state and national awards for its coverage, including a citation from President Richard Nixon.

KFYO after 1973
KFYO, Inc., controlled by S. B. Whittenburg, bought the station in 1973; it was sold six years later to the Seaton Publishing Company in a $1.3 million transaction. The new owners substituted the station's beautiful music programs with a country music format.

The call letters KFYO briefly returned to the FM band in 1985 when the station bought the former KRUX (102.5 FM); the station became KZII-FM on March 27, 1986. That same year, the stations moved to a new studio and tower site on South Slide Road, housing both stations and a new three-tower array for KFYO. Part of the former KFYO transmitter site at 82nd and Quaker was redeveloped into the Kingsgate North shopping center.

In March 1997, KFYO and KZII-FM were sold to GulfStar Communications, who also owned KFMX-FM, KKAM and KRLB-FM 99.5 in Lubbock. The studios returned to 82nd and Quaker, in the Copy Craft building that housed the other GulfStar stations, though the KFYO transmitter remained on South Slide. Clear Channel Communications acquired the GulfStar Lubbock cluster in 2000. In August 2010, KFYO owner Gap Central Broadcasting, which had purchased the Lubbock cluster from Clear Channel in 2007, was folded into Townsquare Media.

KFYO was the longtime home of Texas Tech Red Raiders football and men's basketball games beginning in the late 1990s.  On Christmas Eve 1993, KFYO would broadcast a Red Raider football game for the final time as the team's flagship radio partner.  That game was a 41-10 loss to the Oklahoma Sooners in the 1993 John Hancock Bowl.  The games would move to KKAM the following year.

As part of a changing talk radio landscape, KFYO changed its network affiliation in 2003. On June 1, KFYO ended a 49-year affiliation with CBS and began an affiliation with ABC News Radio, airing such ABC features as Paul Harvey and Sean Hannity.

In December 2010, the Lubbock Bible Class aired its final service and disbanded, having aired their Sunday service on KFYO for a total of 37 years.

In 1970, KFYO donated a 1927 Model T once owned by the station and painted with news headlines of that year to the Texas Tech Museum. In 2015, state representative John Frullo donated $1,000 for the restoration of the Model T.

In October 2016, KFYO added an FM simulcast on the 95.1 FM translator, licensed to Lubbock. Branding for the station changed to "News/Talk 95.1 & 790, KFYO".

In November 2020, Paul R. Beane was inducted into the Texas Radio Hall of Fame. KFYO was Paul's last stop in his storied radio career, hosting the commentary "The Way I See It" from 2010-2014.

In May 2022, Robert Snyder left KFYO, after a 21 year career as the News Director- Program Director.

FM translator
On October 12, 2016, KFYO added an FM simulcast on 95.1 MHz.

Programming
KFYO airs several local news and talk programs, including Surnise LBK with Dave King & Tom Collins in morning drive, Chad Hasty in mid-mornings, and second edition of The Chad Hasty Show in evenings. The remainder of the day features syndicated conservative talkers including Rush Limbaugh, Sean Hannity and Mark Levin. The station also airs ABC News each hour and local weather updates from Ron Roberts who is the Chief Meteorologist at KAMC-TV. KFYO's news anchors include: Luke Matsik, Rob Breaux and Jacob Estrada. On weekends, KFYO airs a mix of local and syndicated weekend programs, including First United Methodist Church services on Sundays, a KFYO fixture since 1952.

References

External links
KFYO Radio official website

FYO
News and talk radio stations in the United States
Radio stations established in 1926
Townsquare Media radio stations